Black Gives Way to Blue is the fourth studio album by the American rock band Alice in Chains, released on September 29, 2009, on the 17th anniversary of the release of their second album, Dirt. It is their first record without original lead singer Layne Staley, who died in 2002, and their first album with new vocalist and rhythm guitarist William DuVall sharing vocal duties with lead guitarist/vocalist Jerry Cantrell, who sings lead vocals on most of the songs. The title track is a tribute to Staley featuring Elton John on piano. This is the first Alice in Chains album released on Virgin Records and their first venture away from Columbia, who handled all of their previous releases. The album debuted at No. 5 on the Billboard 200, and was certified gold by the RIAA on May 26, 2010, with shipments exceeding 500,000 copies in the U.S. and over 1 million copies sold worldwide. The track "A Looking in View" was the first song from the album that was made available for purchase via digital download in June 2009, and despite not being the first official radio single, Rock stations started playing the song and it peaked at No. 12 on Billboards Mainstream Rock Tracks chart. The singles "Check My Brain" and "Your Decision" reached No. 1 on the Mainstream Rock Tracks chart, while "Lesson Learned" reached No. 4. "Check My Brain" was also the band's first No. 1 song on the Alternative Songs chart, and on the Hot Rock Songs chart, and it also reached No. 92 on Billboards Hot 100, becoming the band's first single to appear on the chart. "Check My Brain" and "A Looking in View" were both nominated for the Grammy Award for Best Hard Rock Performance in 2010 and 2011, respectively. Black Gives Way to Blue won Revolver magazine's Golden Gods Award for Album of the Year in 2010.

The span of nearly fourteen years between the self-titled album and Black Gives Way to Blue, marks the longest gap between studio albums in Alice in Chains' career. The band reunited in early 2006, with DuVall as their new singer. By April 2007, Alice in Chains had been writing and demoing songs for the album, but the band did not show further signs of progress until October 2008, when they announced that they had begun recording with producer Nick Raskulinecz in the studio. The album was recorded at Foo Fighters' Studio 606 in Northridge and at the Henson Recording Studios in Los Angeles, produced by Raskulinecz and Alice in Chains. The band did not have a record label at the time of the recording and the album was funded by Cantrell and drummer Sean Kinney. The writing and recording process was completed on Cantrell's 43rd birthday, on March 18, 2009. Musically, the album sees the band return to the heavy metal/hard rock style of Dirt and Facelift instead of the murky dark mood that their third album showcased with more grunge-fuzz pedal elements; some songs also have acoustic elements reminiscent of the band's two acoustic EPs and also from their third full-length album. It also includes songs which Cantrell described as "the heaviest he's ever written".

Background and recording

On February 18, 2005, guitarist Jerry Cantrell, bassist Mike Inez, and drummer Sean Kinney reunited to perform a benefit concert in Seattle for victims of the tsunami disaster that struck South Asia. It was the band's first live performance since 1996. On March 10, 2006, the surviving members performed at VH1's Decades Rock Live concert, honoring fellow Seattle musicians Ann and Nancy Wilson of Heart. Comes with the Fall vocalist William DuVall made his first public performance with the band during that show singing Alice in Chains' "Rooster". The band followed the concert with a short United States club tour, several festival dates in Europe, and a brief tour in Japan. DuVall joined Alice in Chains as lead singer during the band's reunion concerts. DuVall was an old friend of Cantrell's. They met in Los Angeles in 2000 through a mutual acquaintance, and DuVall's band Comes with the Fall was both the opening act and also Cantrell's backing band during the tour for his second solo album, Degradation Trip, in 2001 and 2002.

About the reunion concerts, Cantrell stated, "We want to celebrate what we did and the memory of our friend. We have played with some [singers] who can actually bring it and add their own thing to it without being a Layne clone. We're not interested in stepping on [Staley's] rich legacy. It's a tough thing to go through. Do you take the Led Zeppelin approach and never play again, because the guy was that important? That's the approach we've taken for a lot of years. Or, do you give it a shot, try something? We're willing to take a chance on it. It's completely a reunion because the three of us who're left are back together. But it's not about separating and forgetting — it's about remembering and moving on."

Kinney mentioned in a February 2006 interview that he would be interested in writing new material, but not as Alice in Chains. He explained, "If we found some other dude, I'd love to move on, write some cool tunes and change the name and go on like that. I don't see continuing as Alice and replacing somebody. ... We're not trying to replace Layne. We want to play these songs one more time, and if it seems like the right thing to do, it'll happen. I don't know how long it will go or where it will take us. It's kind of a tribute to Layne and our fans, the people who love these songs. It's not some 'I'm broke and I need the money' situation. We love playing together."

In April 2007, the band's "official blogger", Baldy, posted an update on progress towards the writing of the album, saying that Alice in Chains had been in Los Angeles, California for five days, "sat through three rehearsals and one demo recording session, listened to several other demos" and the new material was "kicking his ass right out of his pants." By March 2008, the band started writing and working together, and that was the start of the new album. According to Kinney, they just wanted to hear what their new music sounded like, as they were at Carmen Miranda's old studio, so they decided to record it. "It’s a very musical place. And everything was so good we decided to record it. It's a tremendous undertaking, but at the end of it I haven’t felt this good about something since we were kids". In September 2008, it was reported that Alice in Chains would enter the studio that October to begin recording a new album for a summer 2009 release.

Recording began on October 23, 2008 at the Foo Fighters' Studio 606 in Northridge, California, with producer Nick Raskulinecz (Foo Fighters, Rush, Stone Sour, Trivium, Shadows Fall, Death Angel). The band did not have a record label at the time and the album was funded by Jerry Cantrell and Sean Kinney. In December 2008, they moved into the Henson Recording Studios in Los Angeles. Staley's mother, Nancy McCallum, was supportive of the band's decision to move on and visited them during their recording sessions. Other members of Staley's family were also supportive of the band. Manager Susan Silver said "it was really important that it was OK with them". In April 2009, Cantrell told at the Revolver's Golden Gods Awards Show that Alice in Chains had finished recording the album on March 18, 2009 (his 43rd birthday and also the same day that William DuVall's son was born), and were in the process of mixing it for a September release. Elton John recorded the piano track for the song "Black Gives Way to Blue" in a Las Vegas studio on April 23, 2009.

Manager David Benveniste began approaching record labels with a sampling of four or five songs from the new sessions, and the offers started coming from every major label. The band eventually signed with Virgin/EMI.

Album title
When Chris Cornell and Susan Silver's then 9-year-old daughter Lily Cornell Silver asked her mother "what does 'Black Gives Way to Blue' mean?", Silver suggested they call her uncle Jerry [Cantrell] and ask him, and Cantrell explained to her:

On December 1, 2020, Cornell Silver made her musical debut performing the song along with Chris DeGarmo at the MoPOP Founders Award tribute to Alice in Chains following an introduction by her mother.

Music and lyrics

In April 2009, a blog post from the band expressed the hope that "these songs will strike a chord and make a similar impact on all of you out there that were moved by this band in the first place." Kinney said that the music on the album doesn't deviate too far from the band's past music, adding, "It's nice to sound like yourself...It's not really that hard, actually. I know people are blown away that we really sound like ourselves, and I understand the apprehension, but it's not really that big a stretch to sound the way that you sound." There are hard rock as well as acoustic songs featured on the album.

Kinney said that there are lyrics on the album that deal with original vocalist Layne Staley. He elaborated, "There's not a day that goes by that I don't think of him. And there's a lot to address, with all of that stuff coming to the forefront. A lot has happened since 1995; a lot has happened in our lives and we've never talked about it or discussed it publicly. So some of that is what's addressed here. That's the way we operate, it's about what really happened in life. We're not really the fast cars and chicks songs. It's basically what's happened in life, but a lot has happened since the last record. And it's on this record."

The title track, "Black Gives Way to Blue", was written as a tribute to Staley and features Cantrell on lead vocals and Elton John on piano. Regarding the lyrics to other specific songs, Cantrell said the first single from the album, "A Looking in View", "basically speaks to any number of things that keep you balled up inside." The second single, "Check My Brain", features lyrics dealing with Cantrell's move from Seattle to Los Angeles in 2003. The third single, "Your Decision", contains lyrics about "surviving pain and choosing to live." Cantrell also denied a popular misconception that the song "Private Hell" is about Layne Staley. He stated that the song is in fact about himself breaking up with a girl that he loved a lot and he "wasn't man enough to go through with it". But Cantrell also pointed out that there's a lot of things in the song that aren't specifically about that and other people can relate to.

"Last of My Kind" is the only song in the album that features William DuVall singing lead vocals without harmonizing with Cantrell, who only sings back up vocals in the song. DuVall also wrote the lyrics and the melody of the song. DuVall wrote a song called "Tongue Tied" about his friend Sean Costello, who died by suicide in 2008, but the song was cut from the album.

Cantrell said about singing lead vocals in the album:

Cover artwork
The album cover art features an anatomical illustration of a heart surrounded by a black and blue background. The illustration was made by British designer Matt Taylor. According to William DuVall, the cover was Sean Kinney's basic concept, but the other members also had a hand in it. Photos of the band taken by photographer James Minchin III and illustrations designed by Emmanuel Polanco complete the booklet.

Jerry Cantrell explained the album cover in an interview with Billboard in October 2009:
The whole thing with the heart... there wasn't a real intention or a reason. It's just a collection of ideas that we put together. To me, we had our hearts broken by losing Layne and losing ourselves. And also it took a lot of that to get through this process and to even take the chance, and to stand-up and risk. It celebrates his life. Staley's bandmates also thanked him in the album's liner notes.

Guitar manufacturer G&L made a custom Rampage guitar for Cantrell with the artwork for the album cover on the body. The guitar was unveiled in January 2010 on the G&L booth at the NAMM Show in Anaheim, California.

For the opening of their concerts on the Black Gives Way to Blue tour, Alice in Chains used to project the album cover with a heart beating onto the stage's curtain before the band hit the stage.

Promotion
To help promote the album, on September 17, 2009, Alice in Chains released an EPK featuring all four of the members being interviewed while the Kiss makeup is being applied on them.

An app for iPhone was released on October 27, 2009, featuring audio streaming of three songs from the album ("Check My Brain", "A Looking In View" and "Acid Bubble"), the music videos for "Check My Brain" and "A Looking In View", breaking news, photos, tour dates, band bio, discography, fan wall for commenting and access to Alice In Chains merchandise, tickets, web site and band mailing list.

Release and reception

On April 25, 2009, it was reported that the new Alice in Chains album would be released on their new label Virgin/EMI, making it the band's first label change in their 20-plus year career. On June 11, 2009, it was announced that the new album would be titled Black Gives Way to Blue and the release date was scheduled for September 29, 2009, the same day that Alice in Chains' second album, Dirt, was released in 1992.

Alice in Chains revealed parts of their new album at a listening party on July 14, 2009 at the Ricardo Montalbán Theater in Los Angeles. They played the entire album over the PA system and performed an acoustic set including versions of songs "Your Decision" and "Black Gives Way to Blue". Keyboardist Derek Sherinian guested with the band on this event. Another listening event took place on July 21, 2009 in New York.

The UK magazine Classic Rock awarded the album nine out of ten stars in its review section in September 2009. Metal Hammer magazine awarded the album 10/10 in September while Nigel Britto of The Times of India lauded the album as a "stunner", later going on to describe it as a "huge, huge success".

On June 30, 2009, one of the songs from the album, "A Looking in View", was made available for purchase via iTunes and Amazon, and for a limited time it was available as a free download through the official Alice in Chains website in early July. Although it wasn't the album's first radio single, Rock stations across the U.S. started playing the song. The music video for "A Looking in View" debuted via Alice in Chains' official website on July 7, 2009.

"Check My Brain" was released to radio stations as the first official single from the album on August 14, 2009, and was made available for purchase on August 17, 2009. The music video for "Check My Brain" premiered on September 14, 2009.

"A Looking in View" peaked at number 12 on the Billboard Hot Mainstream Rock Tracks chart and at number 27 on the Billboard Rock Songs chart, and "Check My Brain" peaked at number 92 on the Billboard Hot 100, at number 75 on the Hot 100 Airplay chart, at number one on the Billboard Hot Mainstream Rock Tracks, and Billboard Rock Songs charts, and at number one on the Billboard Hot Alternative Rock Tracks chart.

Black Gives Way to Blue debuted at number 5 on the Billboard 200, selling 126,000 in its first week, and entered the UK charts at number 19 on October 5, 2009.

To coincide with the band's European tour, Alice in Chains released its next single, "Your Decision", on November 16, 2009 in the UK, and in the US on December 1. The album's third single debuted on the US Rock Songs chart at number 32, and charted at number 1 on the US Rock Songs, at number 1 on the US Hot Mainstream Rock Tracks and at number 4 on the US Alternative Songs charts.

The third and last single, "Lesson Learned", went to radio on June 22, 2010, and reached number 1 on the US Hot Mainstream Rock Tracks. The music video for the song premiered on Yahoo! Music on September 22, 2010.

Black Gives Way to Blue received Gold certification by the Canadian Recording Industry Association in February 2010, signifying sales of over 40,000 units. The album was certified Gold by the RIAA, in May 2010, selling over 500,000 copies in the U.S.

Black Gives Way to Blue was voted number 2 on Kerrang!s Top 20 albums of 2009 list, and on Metal Hammers Top 50 albums of the year list, and number 7 on Kerrangs 50 Best Albums From 2009. The album won the 2010 Revolver magazine Golden Gods Award in the category Album of the Year, beating out Slayer, Mastodon, Megadeth and Heaven and Hell.

Music videos 
More music videos have been released in support of Black Gives Way to Blue than for any previous Alice in Chains release. Videos were released for "A Looking in View", "Check My Brain", "Your Decision", "Acid Bubble" (which is available as an interactive video on AliceinChains.com), "Last of My Kind" and "Lesson Learned". Three of the videos ("A Looking in View", "Acid Bubble", and "Lesson Learned") do not feature the band in any way, which is a first (the music video for "Get Born Again" featured glimpses of the band with images used from previous videos).

An official video for "Private Hell" was published on Alice in Chains' official YouTube channel on September 27, 2019, to celebrate the 10th anniversary of Black Gives Way to Blue. The video features behind the scenes footage of the band on studio recording the album between December 2008 and January 2009.

Track listing

Personnel

Alice in Chains
Jerry Cantrell – lead and backing vocals, lead guitar
William DuVall – backing vocals, rhythm guitar, lead vocals in "Last of My Kind"
Mike Inez – bass, backing vocals
Sean Kinney – drums, percussion

Additional performers
Elton John – piano on "Black Gives Way to Blue"
Lisa Coleman – vibraphone on "Black Gives Way to Blue"
Chris Armstrong – tabla on "When the Sun Rose Again"
Stevie Black – string arrangement, performance, and engineering on "Your Decision" and "Private Hell"

Production
Produced by Nick Raskulinecz and Alice in Chains
Recorded by Paul Figueroa with additional engineering by Nick Raskulinecz, assisted by John Lousteau, Martin Cooke, and Kevin Mills
Mixed by Randy Staub
Mastered by Ted Jensen
Art direction by Alice in Chains & Matt Taylor
Artwork and design by Matt Taylor
Band photography by James Minchin III
Package interior photography by Rocky Schenck
Illustrations pages 7 & 11 by Emmanuel Polanco
Management by Velvet Hammer Music and Management Group and Susan Silver Management

Awards

Revolver Golden Gods Awards

|-
| 2010
| Black Gives Way to Blue
| Album of the Year
|

Grammy Awards

|-
| 2010
| "Check My Brain"
| Best Hard Rock Performance
| 
|-
| 2011
| "A Looking in View"
| Best Hard Rock Performance
|

Metal Storm Awards

|-
| rowspan="2" | 2009 || rowspan="2"| Black Gives Way to Blue
| Best Alternative Metal Album
| 
|-
| Biggest Surprise
|

Charts

Weekly charts

Year-end charts

Singles

Certifications

References

External links
 Official website
 

2009 albums
Alice in Chains albums
EMI Records albums
Virgin Records albums
Doom metal albums by American artists
Sludge metal albums
Albums produced by Nick Raskulinecz